Chrostosoma echemus is a moth of the subfamily Arctiinae. It was described by Caspar Stoll in 1782. It is found in Suriname and the Amazon region.

References

Biodiversity Heritage Library

Chrostosoma
Moths described in 1782